Nerys is a Welsh feminine given name. It may be a modern coinage, an elaboration of Middle Welsh ner "lord, chief" (which relates to the modern Welsh words nêr "hero" and nerth "manliness, courage") using the popular suffix -ys (found in Carys, Dilys, Gladys and Glenys).

People with the name
Nerys Evans (born 1980), Welsh politician
Nerys Hughes (born 1941), Welsh actress
Nerys Jefford (born 1962), British judge
Nerys Johnson (1942–2001), Welsh artist
Nerys Jones (born 1984), Welsh athlete

Fictional
Kira Nerys, one of the main characters in Star Trek: Deep Space Nine (Nerys is her given name)
Nerys, a character in Doctor Who
Nerys Bailey, a character (mother of Roger) in My Family
Nerys Edwards, a character in Gwaith/Cartref

Welsh feminine given names